Lunalilo Home is a Hawaiian charity that provides community living service for the elderly in need of assistance. The charity serves also other Native Hawaiian people struggling with poverty. Lunalilo Home was established in 1883 and was originally located in Makiki. Originally there were 53 residents.

The charity was founded by the will of Lunalilo who died in 1874. The trustees of the charity would be picked by the judges of the Supreme Court of Hawaii.

References 

Charities based in Hawaii
1874 establishments in Hawaii
Hawaiian royalty